Barbon Hillclimb is a hillclimb held near Kirkby Lonsdale, Cumbria, north-west England. The event is held on the Barbon Manor estate with the course ordinarily being used as a driveway to Barbon Manor, a Victorian shooting lodge. (The Manor house is not open to the public). 
The course is 738 yards (675 metres) in length, making it the shortest of the British Hill Climb Championship tracks outside the Channel Islands. 
Since 2013, the car events have been promoted by Liverpool Motor Club in addition to their popular Sprints at Aintree. 

Motorcycle events were run at Barbon by the Westmorland Motor Club until 2011, but resumed in 2019.

History 
From 1950 to 2012, Westmorland Motor Club ran three events per year at the venue: two for cars and one for motorcycles, though the motorcycle events took a break in 2011 but ran again in 2019.
Since 2013 the car events have been run by Barbon Hillclimb Ltd, a joint venture between Kirkby Londsdale Motor Club and Liverpool Motor Club, the latter being the official promoter of the events.

The target for 1963 competitors was the existing record by Jack Cordingley's JBW-Maserati in a time of 30.46 secs.
A new hill record was set by Jos Goodyear on 4 July 2015 of 20.08 secs, beating the previous record held by Scott Moran in 2008. Goodyear's record still stands despite several competitors getting very close to breaking it.

Substantial re-surfacing took place in 2015 and the British Hillclimb Championship event moved from May to July to further improve the events for competitors and spectators alike. The British Championship rounds last visited Barbon in 2019.

The spectacular and challenging venue hosts highly competitive Regional and National Championship car events in June and July each year, attracting a loyal following of competitors and spectators.

Barbon Hillclimb car event past winners

Key: R = New Course Record.
All details extracted from Barbon Hillclimb Programmes unless indicated otherwise

Footnotes

External links
 Liverpool Motor Club
 Barbon Hillclimb

Hillclimbs
Auto races in the United Kingdom